David Cerrajería Rubio (born 4 June 1983), commonly known as Cerra, is a Spanish former footballer who played as a defender (either right or left back).

Football career
After three seasons with lowly Alicante CF in Segunda División B, Valencia-born Cerra signed for Valencia CF. Although already 22, he would spend the next two years registered with its B-team, playing his first season in Tercera División, with promotion.

As a versatile defensive unit capable of playing as a right or left back, Cerra found action on either side of the pitch in five La Liga matches, his debut coming on 5 November 2006 in a 1–1 away draw against RCD Espanyol. This was due to a storm of injuries that hit the back-four sector hard in the campaign (Emiliano Moretti and Asier del Horno the more serious ones).

Cerra was loaned to Segunda División's Polideportivo Ejido for 2007–08 and, after the Andalusia team's relegation, left Valencia for another club in the community, Levante UD. He appeared in 15 games in his second year – 11 starts – helping to a return to the top flight after two years.

References

External links

1983 births
Living people
Spanish footballers
Footballers from Valencia (city)
Association football defenders
La Liga players
Segunda División players
Segunda División B players
Tercera División players
Alicante CF footballers
Valencia CF Mestalla footballers
Valencia CF players
Polideportivo Ejido footballers
Levante UD footballers
Córdoba CF players
Super League Greece players
Platanias F.C. players
Liga II players
CSM Ceahlăul Piatra Neamț players
Spanish expatriate footballers
Expatriate footballers in Greece
Expatriate footballers in Romania